El Paso Wrecking Corp.  (1978) is an American gay pornographic film written and directed by Tim Kincaid, better known as Joe Gage. It is the second in what has come to be known as his "Working Man Trilogy", which begins with 1976's Kansas City Trucking Co. and concludes with 1979's L.A. Tool & Die. The lead roles are by Richard Locke and Fred Halsted.

Premise 

Hank (Richard Locke) and Gene (Fred Halsted) are fired from their trucker jobs after an alcohol-fueled brawl. The two search for opportunities in the blue-collar workforce, but are often distracted by other men along the way.

Cast 

 Richard Locke as Hank
 Fred Halsted as Gene
 Beth McDyer as Lil
 Georgina Spelvin as Millie, Roadhouse Owner
 Steve King as Will, as Voyeuristic Man
 Jeanne Marie Marchaud as Voyeuristic Woman
 Stan Braddock as Foreman
 Aaron Taylor as Jim as Man in Car
 Robert Snowden as Wayne as Man in Car
 Keith Anthoni as Boyd, Bike Rider
 Kenneth Brown as Chuck, Stranded Motorist
 Rob Carter as Homer, Mechanic
 Clay Russell as Roy, Park Ranger
 Veronica Compton as Cindi

 Guillermo Ricardo as Diego, Gardener
 Lou Davis as Roger, Repairman
 Jared Benson as Seth
 Mike Morris as Mr. Harris
 Hal Dorn
 Tim Kincaid
 Ty Harper
 Elmer Jackson
 Yank Jankowski
 Christian Laage
 Buck Lingren
 Bill Oberfeldt
 Al Yeager

Legacy 

Adult Video News (2006) included the "Working Man Trilogy" in its list of the top ten most innovative, influential and "hottest" gay pornographic films.

Critical reception 

TLA Video, in their review of the DVD release, was very favorable towards the film, giving it four stars out of a possible four.

DVD release 

The films comprising the "Working Man Trilogy" were restored and released on DVD by HIS Video.

References

External links 

 

1978 films
Films directed by Joe Gage (Tim Kincaid)
Gay pornographic films
1970s pornographic films
American pornographic films
1970s English-language films
1970s American films